The 8th Politburo of the Lao People's Revolutionary Party (LPRP), officially the Political Bureau of the 8th Central Committee of the Lao People's Revolutionary Party, was elected in 2006 by the 1st Plenary Session of the 8th Central Committee, in the immediate aftermath of the 8th National Congress.

Members

References

Specific

Bibliography
Articles and journals:
 

8th Politburo of the Lao People's Revolutionary Party
2006 establishments in Laos
2011 disestablishments in Laos